All Inclusive (Spanish: Todo incluido) is a 2008 Chilean-Mexican film.  The film focuses on a Chilean family staying at a Mexican resort.  During their time at the resort, they each have experiences affecting their lives, and their problems become apparent.

Cast
 Jesús Ochoa as Gonzalo
 Martha Higareda as Camila
 Maya Zapata as Usnavy
 Ana Serradilla as Macarena
 Jaime Camil as Baldi
 Leonor Varela as Miranda
 Fernando Arroyo as Ian
 Mónica Cruz as Clemencia
 Eduardo Cuervo as Hector
 Patricio Lynch as a man with Miranda
 Valentina Vargas as Carmen
 Edgar Vivar as a taxi cab driver
 Jesús Zavala as Andres

External links
 
 

2008 films
2008 drama films
2000s Spanish-language films